Effie T. Brown is a film and television producer known for such films as Rocket Science, Real Women Have Curves, Everyday People, Desert Blue, Dear White People, and But I'm a Cheerleader. She is seen in the fourth season of Project Greenlight as a producer on that season's film project The Leisure Class.

Background

Effie Brown grew up in the greater Los Angeles area. She attended the all-girls St. Lucy's Priory High School in Glendora, California. She received a degree in film production from Loyola Marymount University (LMU) in Los Angeles.

Upon graduation from LMU, Brown quickly rose up in the ranks in the film industry to become Director of Development for Tim Burton's production company in 1995. A few years later, she became one of the first participants in Project:Involve, a fellowship program sponsored by the Independent Feature Project/Los Angeles (now Film Independent). She completed the program in 1999 and with numerous feature films and television productions to her credit, Brown has become one of Project:Involve's major success stories.

Project Greenlight controversy 
In the fourth-season premiere of Project Greenlight, Effie Brown, along with director Peter Farrelly and actors Matt Damon and Ben Affleck, met to decide which filmmakers would be chosen to direct a feature film for the show. Among the finalists considered were a directing team of an Asian American man, Leo Angelos, and a white woman, Kristen Brancaccio. Effie Brown expressed her support of this team, stating that "I would just urge people to think about whoever this director is, the way that they’re going to treat the character of Harmony, her being a prostitute,” Brown counters. “[She’s] the only black person, being a hooker who gets hit by her white pimp." Damon responded that "when you’re talking about diversity, you do it in the casting of the film, not the casting of the show." Critics of Damon's comments stated that he was "mansplaining" and "whitesplaining" diversity to Effie Brown and accused him of being racially tone deaf.

Selected filmography 
 Desert Blue (1998), line producer
 But I'm A Cheerleader (1999), line producer
 Things You Can Tell Just by Looking at Her (2000), line producer
 Stranger Inside (2001), producer
 Real Women Have Curves (2002), producer
 In the Cut (2003), executive producer
 Everyday People (2004), producer
 Rocket Science (2007), producer
 Dear White People (2014), producer
 The Inspection (2022), producer

Awards and recognition
 Distinguished Young Alumni Award, Loyola Marymount University
 Motorola Producer's Award, Film Independent Spirit Awards

References

External links

Living people
American film producers
American television producers
American women television producers
African-American film producers
African-American television producers
Loyola Marymount University alumni
Date of birth missing (living people)
Year of birth missing (living people)
21st-century African-American people
21st-century African-American women